Instituto Asunción de Querétaro is a private school in Querétaro City, Querétaro, Mexico. It serves preschool through senior high school (preparatoria).

It was established in 1966 by Lupita López de Mora and Pita Fernández de Urquiza, and Guadalupe Galindo Heredia served as the school's first director. The first high school graduation occurred in 1997, with 37 students graduating.

References

External links
 Instituto Asunción de Querétaro 

High schools in Mexico
Querétaro City
Education in Querétaro
Buildings and structures in Querétaro
1966 establishments in Mexico
Educational institutions established in 1966